Harpalus nevadensis is a species of ground beetle in the subfamily Harpalinae. It was described by K. Daniel & J. Daniel in 1898.

References

nevadensis
Beetles described in 1898